Web Therapy is a web series of Lstudio.com mainly based on improvisation. Lisa Kudrow appears as the self-absorbed therapist Fiona Wallice who offers three-minute therapy sessions via webcam over the internet. Each webisode stars Kudrow video chatting with one or more guest stars.

All episodes are written by Lisa Kudrow, Don Roos, and Dan Bucatinsky, and all episodes are directed by Don Roos.

Series overview

Episode list

Season 1 (2008) 
 Season 1 consists of five stories each divided in three parts thus making 15 webisodes.
 Tim Bagley, Rashida Jones, Bob Balaban, Jane Lynch, Drew Sherman, Patty Guggenheim and Dan Bucatinsky star as Fiona Wallice's clients this season.

Season 2 (2009) 

 Season 2 consists of five stories each divided in three parts thus making 15 webisodes similarly to the first season.
 Julie Claire, Courteney Cox, Steven Weber, Alan Cumming and Dan Bucatinsky star as Fiona Wallice's clients this season.
 Dan Bucatinsky reprises his role as Jerome Sokoloff while Victor Garber guest stars as Fiona's husband, Kip.

Season 3 (2010) 

 Season 3 consists of 15 webisodes.
 After the third season had been completed, three special webisodes starring Meryl Streep as Camilla Bowner were added making a total of 18 webisodes.
 This season mostly revolves around Fiona's husband's political campaign.
 Julia Louis-Dreyfus, Molly Shannon, Selma Blair, Michael McDonald, Tim Bagley, Julie Claire and Dan Bucatinsky all guest star this season.
 Tim Bagley, Julie Claire and Dan Bucatinsky reprise their roles from previous seasons as Richard Pratt, Robin Griner and Jerome Sokoloff respectively.

Season 4 (2011–2012) 

 Season 4 consists of 17 webisodes.
 Rosie O'Donnell, Conan O'Brien, Natasha Bedingfield, Minnie Driver, Lily Tomlin and Dan Bucatinsky guest star this season.

Season 5 (2013) 

 Season 5 consists of 35 webisodes.

Season 6 (2014) 

 Season 6 consists of 33 webisodes.

References

American web series
Lists of web series episodes